Kand-e Tatar (also Romanized as Kand-e Tātār and Kand Tātār; also known as Chashmeh Thāthār, Chashmeh-ye Tāteh, Cheshmeh Tātā, Cheshmeh Tātār (Persian: چشمه تاتار), Cheshmeh-ye Tāteh, and Kand Tātā) is a village in Shivanat Rural District, Afshar District, Khodabandeh County, Zanjan Province, Iran. At the 2006 census, its population was 78, in 20 families.

References 

Populated places in Khodabandeh County